Ulanlar (also Romanized as Ūlanlar; also known as Raḩmānābād and Ūranar) is a village in Chaybasar-e Jonubi Rural District, in the Central District of Maku County, West Azerbaijan Province, Iran. At the 2006 census, its population was 219, in 48 families.

References 

Populated places in Maku County